Crosses is a commune in the Cher department in the Centre-Val de Loire region of France.

Geography
The river Airain flows north through the middle of the village.

Population

Sights
 The church of St. Martin, dating from the twelfth century.
 The chateau of Sonpize.

See also
Communes of the Cher department

References

External links

Official website of Crosses 

Communes of Cher (department)